

Prevalence
Madagascar is among very few countries in Sub-Saharan Africa with an opportunity to slow the human immunodeficiency virus epidemic and avert the socioeconomic destruction that is evident in high-prevalence areas. With the internal and external migration of workforce to keep up with the labor needs of these economic zones, Madagascar will be faced with an increased problem containing HIV, which would have a negative effect on the economic and development efforts. If these problems are not proactively addressed, Madagascar could actually reverse the benefits brought to the country through the period of economic prosperity and increase its health and social burden.

Even though low, the HIV prevalence in Madagascar is increasing, as seen among pregnant women attending antenatal clinics; prevalence in this population rose from 0.064% in 1995 to 1.1% in 2003. Madagascar's rapid increase in HIV prevalence is likely influenced by a variety of conditions, including low literacy, widespread poverty, limited access to health and social services, high rates of partner change, and an increasingly transient population. Madagascar also has some of the highest rates of sexually transmitted infections (STIs) in the world. Services for prevention and treatment of HIV, such as counseling and testing and antiretroviral therapy, are being offered, but only a small portion of the Malagasy in need currently benefit from these interventions. At the end of 2003, Madagascar had only 13 sites offering counseling and testing services to 2,082 clients annually. Treatment for HIV is still limited in Madagascar, with only one site in the country currently offering antiretroviral therapy at the end of 2003. As of September 2004, only 30 of an estimated 17,000 adults in need of treatment for advanced HIV were receiving antiretroviral therapy.

National response
Efforts by the United States Agency for International Development (USAID) and other donors to garner the commitment of the Government of Madagascar to HIV prevention and treatment have paid off. One of the primary supports to addressing Madagascar's emerging epidemic is the powerful political commitment at the highest levels of the new government. Just after his inauguration in 2002, President Marc Ravalomanana publicly established his leadership in HIV prevention. He chairs the nation's multisectoral HIV/AIDS program [Conseil National de Lutte contre le SIDA (CNLS)]. President Ravalomanana is committed to aggressively fighting the spread of HIV, and the government has taken bold steps to control the spread of the infection. The National Strategic Framework was approved by the government in December 2001 and was adjusted following the first national seroprevalence survey in 2003. The country's overall strategy focuses on behavior change and prevention, treatment of HIV and STIs, and AIDS education.

With the guidance of USAID and other partners, the Government of Madagascar is actively responding to gaps in its HIV/AIDS program. The government will use $13.4 million from The Global Fund to Fight AIDS, Tuberculosis and Malaria to expand current interventions by opening 40 new counseling and testing sites in 2005 and will reinforce existing HIV-prevention measures by ensuring use of universal precaution measures, reinforcing blood transfusion safety, and providing free condoms in public health care facilities. New interventions will include measures to prevent mother-to-child HIV transmission in 11 districts and the provision of psychosocial and community medical care for about 500 to 750 persons living with HIV/AIDS. The program will also lay the groundwork for the care of the estimated 30,000 children orphaned by AIDS.

References

Madagascar
Madagascar
Health in Madagascar